Cychrus ludmilae is a species of ground beetle in the subfamily of Carabinae. It was described by Imura in 1999.

References

ludmilae
Beetles described in 1999